Portuguese Cove is a rural community in the Halifax Regional Municipality, Nova Scotia  on Route 349 on the Chebucto Peninsula .

History
The name comes from the Portuguese fishermen who for many years sailed in the summer months fishing in the 18th century. A local fishing vessel discovered the passengers in three small vessels stranded in the fog and guided them to safety at Portuguese Cove. Captain Hickey reported, the "inhabitants of Portuguese cove behaved towards us all with every possible mark of hospitality, kindness, and attention, that humanity could dictate."

References

External links
Destination Nova Scotia
Explore HRM

Communities in Halifax, Nova Scotia
General Service Areas in Nova Scotia